Sir Cedric Stanton Hicks (2 June 1892 – 7 February 1976) was an Australian pharmacologist, physiologist and nutritionist. He was Professor of Human Physiology and Pharmacology at the University of Adelaide.

Biography
Hicks was born in Mosgiel, New Zealand; his grandmother, Adelaide Hicks, was a community midwife and nurse in the area. He was educated first at Otago Boys' High School and the University of Otago, and after being awarded a Beit medical research fellowship in 1923, he travelled to England and studied at Trinity College, Cambridge.  Under the fellowship, he also carried out research in Switzerland, Italy, Germany and the United States of America.  He took up a fellowship and lectureship at the University of Adelaide in 1926. 
In January 1927 he was appointed to a new chair of physiology and pharmacology at the University, a post he held until 1957.

During World War II Hicks founded the Australian Army Catering Corps and served as its commander from 1943. Hicks worked closely with the Australian Army Catering Corps as an adviser on nutrition and was on the Defence Department's Scientific Advisory Committee as its advisor on foodstuffs.

In 1953, Hicks co-authored a book on organic farming with colonel H. F. White, Life From the Soil. A prolific author, in 1972 he published a book on his wartime catering experience under the title, Who Called the Cook a Bastard?. 

He died in 1976 in Glen Osmond, South Australia.

Selected publications

Life From the Soil (with H. F. White, 1953)
Who Called the Cook a Bastard? (1972)

References

External links
 Hicks' grave

1892 births
1976 deaths
Alumni of Trinity College, Cambridge
Australian Army officers
Australian chemists
Australian military personnel of World War I
Australian pharmacologists
Australian physiologists
Knights Bachelor
New Zealand emigrants to Australia
New Zealand military personnel of World War I
Nutritionists
Organic farmers
People educated at Otago Boys' High School
People from Mosgiel
Academic staff of the University of Adelaide
University of Otago alumni